Gary Nicholas Brazil (born 19 September 1962) is an English former professional footballer and football manager, who is now academy manager at Nottingham Forest. He scored 160 goals in 658 league and cup games in an 18-year professional career.

Starting out at Crystal Palace, he turned professional with Sheffield United in 1980. Five years later, following a loan spell with Port Vale, he signed with Preston North End. He spent four seasons with Preston, then spent one season at Newcastle United, before transferring to Fulham in 1990. After a six-year spell with the club he moved on to Cambridge United, Barnet, and finally Slough Town. He helped Sheffield United to win promotion out of the Third Division in 1983–84, and was named as Preston North End's Player of the Year in 1987, having helped the club to win promotion out of the Fourth Division in 1986–87.

He went into coaching in 1999, and spent two periods as manager of Notts County and three spells as a caretaker manager at Nottingham Forest, where he was appointed academy manager in 2014.

Playing career

Sheffield United
Having joined Crystal Palace straight from school in 1979, Brazil stayed with Palace for just twelve months before taking the opportunity of first team football with Sheffield United, signing on a free transfer in August 1980. In nearly five years at Bramall Lane he played 78 games, of which 30 were as a substitute, scoring 10 goals. The "Blades" suffered relegation out of the Third Division in 1980–81 under Harry Haslam. After Ian Porterfield took charge, they then made an immediate return as champions of the Fourth Division in 1981–82. A mid-table finish in 1982–83 followed, before a second promotion in three years was achieved with a third-place finish in 1983–84, though they had only finished ahead of Hull City on goals scored. In August 1984 he joined Port Vale on loan, and scored three goals in six Fourth Division appearances for John Rudge's "Valiants".

Preston North End
Brazil was sold on to Preston North End for £25,000 in August 1985, but could not prevent Tommy Booth's "Lilywhites" from being relegated out of the Third Division. The next season again was a disappointment, although Brazil was now a regular and scoring frequently Preston finished the season in 91st place in the Football League and were forced to seek re-election, forcing the powers that be at Deepdale to make vast changes. Brazil was voted Player of the Year in 1987, as the club won promotion in second place, with Brazil and John Thomas scoring 48 goals between them. The 1987–88 campaign was one of consolidation, though Preston narrowly missed out on a Wembley cup final when they lost to Burnley in the Football League Trophy semi-final. A promotion push in 1988–89 ended in defeat to former club Port Vale in the play-off semi-finals. However Brazil had already departed, having been picked up by Newcastle United for a fee of £200,000 (of which half was made up in a swap deal with Ian Bogie) in February 1989. In all competitions he had played 202 games for Preston, scoring 72 goals.

Newcastle United
Brazil started just three games of the rest of the season, as Newcastle suffered relegation out of the First Division. Manager Jim Smith gave him just five starts in 1989–90 behind strike partners Mark McGhee and Micky Quinn in the first team pecking order at St James' Park. In September 1990, he moved on to Fulham for a fee of £110,000. In six seasons at Craven Cottage Brazil played 254 matches and scored 60 goals. He hit five goals in 1990–91, as the "Cottagers" almost exited the Third Division at the wrong end under the stewardship of Alan Dicks. Brazil finished as the club's top scorer in 1991–92 with 14 goals, as the club missed out on the play-offs by three places and four points. Following an indifferent 1992–93 campaign, he finished as the club's top scorer again in 1993–94 with 14 goals; however his scoring record was not enough to prevent the club slipping into the bottom tier under Don Mackay. An unsuccessful promotion campaign followed in 1994–95 under Ian Branfoot's stewardship, with Fulham finishing two places and three points outside the play-offs.

Later career
Upon leaving Fulham in at the end of 1995–96 he had spells at Cambridge United and Barnet, also of the Third Division. Fulham would finally win promotion out of the division in 1996–97 under new boss Micky Adams. In February 1997, he moved into Conference football with Slough Town. He had a fifteen-month spell with Slough, scoring ten goals in 69 games.

Managerial and coaching career

Notts County 
After retiring as a player, Brazil joined Notts County as a coach and then as assistant manager to Sam Allardyce. Following Allardyce's departure to Bolton Wanderers in October 1999, Brazil was prompted to take charge of a "Magpies" team that was enjoying a promising start to the season. The team faltered during the first half of 2000 and finished the 1999–2000 season in eighth place, two places but 17 points outside of the play-offs. Brazil was demoted back down to assistant manager in May 2000, making way for Jocky Scott. He did receive a second chance at the helm between October and November 2001 after Scott was sacked following repeated clashes with the board, but this short reign was ended abruptly when Brazil was fired after failing to win a game over a five-week period. He went on to serve Doncaster Rovers as youth team coach.

Nottingham Forest 
In May 2012, he was appointed as a youth team coach at Nottingham Forest, replacing the departed Eoin Jess; he was to work alongside Steve Chettle. Brazil progressed through the ranks to become Academy Manager at the club in 2014. He became caretaker manager of the first team after the sacking of Billy Davies in March 2014. During his temporary reign he handed debuts to Ben Osborn, Dimitar Evtimov and Stephen McLaughlin, as well as a league debut to Dorus de Vries, before returning to his role as Academy manager whilst Stuart Pearce took over as first team manager. 

He was handed a second spell as caretaker manager of the club after the departure of Philippe Montanier in January 2017. On 9 February, following a good start to his caretaker spell, Brazil was confirmed as manager for the rest of the 2016–17 season. He was named as EFL manager of the week after overseeing a 3–0 win over Brighton & Hove Albion at the City Ground on 4 March, having changed the game with his substitution of Zach Clough. However, after Forest underwent a series of five defeats in seven games the club appointed Mark Warburton as first team manager on 14 March. 

Credited with the progress of Oliver Burke, Ben Osborn, Joe Worrall, Matty Cash, Jordan Smith and Ben Brereton, Brazil signed a signed a new long-term contract five months later. Warbuton was sacked on New Year's Eve, leaving Brazil to again take on the role as caretaker-manager. On 7 January, he oversaw Forest's 4–2 victory over Arsenal in the Third Round of the FA Cup. Aitor Karanka was appointed as manager the following day.

On 14 October 2020, Nottingham Forest announced that Brazil has signed a new long-term contract with the club. The club announced that he now held the role of Director of Football Development, in which he will assist with Forest's domestic scouting, footballing philosophy and loan programme alongside his role in the club's academy. Brazil's academy graduates have generated over £50 million in transfer revenue for Forest. On 25 May 2021, Nottingham Forest announced that their academy had been upgraded to Category One status. Brazil said "The current and future investments in facilities by Mr Marinakis will take us to another level. It is a fantastic opportunity for the club and it will be really exciting for the staff and players to challenge themselves at the elite end of academy football."

Personal life
He is the father of former England youth player Ellie Brazil, as well as Jack Brazil, former coach of New Mongol Bayangol.

Career statistics

Managerial statistics

Honours
Individual
Preston North End Player of the Year: 1986–87

Sheffield United
Football League Fourth Division: 1981–82
Football League Third Division third-place promotion: 1983–84

Preston North End
Football League Fourth Division second-place promotion: 1986–87

References

External links
 
 

1962 births
Living people
People from Royal Tunbridge Wells
Footballers from Kent
English footballers
Association football midfielders
Association football forwards
Crystal Palace F.C. players
Sheffield United F.C. players
Port Vale F.C. players
Preston North End F.C. players
Newcastle United F.C. players
Fulham F.C. players
Cambridge United F.C. players
Barnet F.C. players
Slough Town F.C. players
English Football League players
National League (English football) players
English football managers
Notts County F.C. managers
Nottingham Forest F.C. managers
English Football League managers
Association football coaches
Notts County F.C. non-playing staff
Doncaster Rovers F.C. non-playing staff
Nottingham Forest F.C. non-playing staff